Julice Mound is an archaeological site in East Carroll Parish, Louisiana with a Plaquemine culture component dating to 1200–1541 CE and located less than one mile from Transylvania Mounds.

Description
The site is located less than a mile from Transylvania Mounds and it is extremely likely that Julice is part of that complex. The site has a single platform mound and is located near a channel that feeds into the Mississippi River and right next to Louisiana Highway 581. A survey from 1954 describes it as being  in height and having a small platform on its summit. Pottery discovered at the site date its occupation to 1200–1541 CE.

See also
Culture, phase, and chronological table for the Mississippi Valley

References

Plaquemine Mississippian culture
Mounds in Louisiana
Geography of East Carroll Parish, Louisiana